Stefano Checchin (born 14 January 1967 in Camposampiero) is an Italian former professional road cyclist. He rode in the 1994 and 1996 Giro d'Italia.

Major results

1988
 1st Trofeo Città di San Vendemiano
1990
 1st Popolarissima
1991
 2nd Trofeo Banca Popolare di Vicenza
1992
 3rd Giro del Belvedere
1993
 1st Giro del Casentino
 1st Trofeo Gianfranco Bianchin
 3rd Overall Giro d'Abruzzo
 3rd Grand Premio di Poggiana
 3rd Piccolo Giro di Lombardia
1996
 10th Overall Tour de Suisse
1997
 3rd Trofeo Melinda
1998
 3rd Giro di Romagna

References

External links

1967 births
Living people
Italian male cyclists
People from Camposampiero
Cyclists from the Province of Padua